Shah Muhammad Ishaq Dehlawi (4 November 1783 – 20 July 1846), was an Indian Muslim scholar with his major focus on hadith studies.

Biography
Ishaq was born on 14 November 1782 in Delhi. He studied hadith from his grandfather Shah Abdul Aziz. He taught at the Madrasah Rahimiyya. He died on 20 July 1846 in Mecca and was buried in Jannat al-Mu'alla next to Khadija bint Khuwaylid.

His students include Ahmad Ali Saharanpuri.

References

Bibliography
 Barkātī, Maḥmūd Aḥmad. 1992. Ḥayāt-i Shāh Muḥammad Isḥāq Muḥaddis̲ Dihlavī. Dihlī: Shāh Abūlk̲h̲air Akāḍmī.
 

1783 births
1846 deaths
Indian Muslims
Indian Islamic religious leaders
People from Delhi
Burials at Jannat al-Mu'alla